Robert Gubiec (born 19 February 1979) is a retired footballer who played as a goalkeeper for clubs in Poland and Greece.

Playing career
Born in Warsaw, Gubiec began playing professional football for local side Polonia Warszawa. He would spend five seasons as a reserve goalkeeper, making just 19 Ekstraklasa appearances for the club. A brief spell at lower-division side Stasiak Opoczno followed before he moved to Wisła Płock. Gubiec made 50 league appearances Wisła Płock.

At age 28, he went abroad for a loan spell with Greek third division side Rodos F.C. in September 2007.

References

External links
 

1979 births
Living people
Polish footballers
Polonia Warsaw players
Wisła Płock players
Rodos F.C. players
Footballers from Warsaw
Association football goalkeepers